Charles Duncan Fearnley (born 12 April 1940), more commonly known as Duncan Fearnley, is a former first-class cricketer who, after retirement as a player, became a producer of cricket bats. Fearnley is also the great uncle of British Olympic gymnast Nile Wilson.

Birth and early life
Fearnley was born in Pudsey, Yorkshire. In 1955 he had just played for the England Schoolboys team and hoped for a career in professional cricket, but during the winter months he began making cricket bats to supplement his income.

The first bats Fearnley made were branded 'Tudor Rose', but soon they became known as 'Fearnley of Farsley'.

Cricket career
Fearnley's main aim was to play professional cricket, and though a phenomenal schoolboy cricketer, he could not make it into his home county's 1st XI, only managing to play for Yorkshire IIs. He sought trials elsewhere to fulfil his ambition and in 1960 he was given the opportunity he'd craved at Worcestershire.

Fearnley was a left-hand opening batsman who played 22 times in Worcestershire's maiden Championship-winning season of 1964 but never really established himself in the side. In seven seasons he made 97 appearances, his average always hovering around 20. After leaving New Road at the end of 1968 he played for Lincolnshire, returning to Worcestershire in 1972 to captain the 2nd XI.

Cricket bat company
At the same time he established his highly successful eponymous bat-manufacturing company, during the early years Fearnley got many of his ex-playing colleagues and opponents to use his products. Introducing new forms of sponsorship, he built the brand around these friends. John Snow was the first to use the Duncan Fearnley bat in an international, with the likes of Basil D'Oliveira and Dennis Amiss close behind.

By the early 1980s, Fearnley had become the dominant brand within the market throughout the world. At the time it seemed everyone was using or wearing the three-wicket symbol. Leading players such as Sunil Gavaskar, Clive Lloyd, Kepler Wessels, Ian Botham, Graham Gooch, Allan Lamb, Viv Richards, Graeme Pollock, Wasim Akram, Ravi Shastri, Allan Border, Martin Crowe and many more were putting their trust in the product.

In 1986 he became Worcestershire's high-profile chairman. He attracted some big names – notably Ian Botham – and the county won two County Championships, two Sunday League titles, one Benson & Hedges Cup and one NatWest Trophy title in his 12 years as chairman, as well as more than doubling the membership.

During the 1990s the marketplace changed, with many smaller brands developing, and cricket bat production started to move overseas to India and Pakistan. Fearnley firmly resisted this trend and cut production accordingly, still concentrating on totally hand-crafted bats at its factory in Worcester.

The company today
Today the brand still operates from its Worcester base, with a factory producing, by hand, up to 5,000 bats per year.

Fearnley still remains one of the major UK manufacturers as other companies seek overseas production and is still one of the world's most recognised names in cricket, with Vikram Solanki and Darren Gough two of the main UK endorsements. New markets include Club Clothing and Ground Equipment. The company manufactures and retails clothing and accessories for the ECB Association of Cricket Officials.

References

External links
 

Living people
1940 births
English cricketers
Worcestershire cricketers
Cricketers from Pudsey
Lincolnshire cricketers
Cricket equipment manufacturers